Pagyris is a genus of clearwing (ithomiine) butterflies, named by Jean Baptiste Boisduval in 1870. They are in the brush-footed butterfly family, Nymphalidae.

Species
Arranged alphabetically:
Pagyris cymothoe (Hewitson, 1855)
Pagyris priscilla Lamas, 1986
Pagyris renelichyi (Neild, 2008)
Pagyris ulla (Hewitson, 1857)

References 

Ithomiini
Nymphalidae of South America
Nymphalidae genera
Taxa named by Jean Baptiste Boisduval